Bram Welten (born 29 March 1997 in Tilburg) is a Dutch cyclist, who currently rides for UCI WorldTeam .

Major results

2014
 3rd Overall Driedaagse van Axel
1st  Points classification
1st  Young rider classification
 8th Road race, UEC European Junior Road Championships
2015
 1st Paris–Roubaix Juniors
 1st Guido Reybrouck Classic
 1st Omloop der Vlaamse Regions
 1st Stage 3 Driedaagse van Axel
2016
 1st Stage 1 Le Triptyque des Monts et Châteaux
 10th Paris–Chauny
2017
 1st Grand Prix Criquielion
 1st Stage 1 Tour de Bretagne
 2nd Tour de Berne
 3rd Grand Prix de la ville de Pérenchies
 9th Road race, UEC European Under-23 Road Championships
2018
 4th Paris–Bourges
 5th Grand Prix de Denain
 5th Kampioenschap van Vlaanderen
 5th Omloop van het Houtland
 6th Paris–Troyes
 9th Scheldeprijs
2019
 2nd Route Adélie
 4th Cholet-Pays de Loire
 8th Nokere Koerse
 8th Grand Prix de Denain
2020
 6th Antwerp Port Epic
2021
 1st Tour de Vendée
 4th La Roue Tourangelle
 4th Grand Prix d'Isbergues
 4th Grote Prijs Marcel Kint
 5th Ronde van Limburg
 5th Druivenkoers Overijse
 6th Grote Prijs Jef Scherens
 8th Bredene Koksijde Classic
 8th Tro-Bro Léon
2022
 5th Nokere Koerse
 6th La Roue Tourangelle
 7th Brussels Cycling Classic
 8th Egmont Cycling Race
 10th Grand Prix de Denain

References

External links

1997 births
Living people
Dutch male cyclists
Sportspeople from Tilburg
European Games competitors for the Netherlands
Cyclists at the 2019 European Games
Cyclists from North Brabant
21st-century Dutch people